Julio César González Trinidad (born 28 June 1992) is a Paraguayan professional footballer who plays as a defender for Liga MX club Necaxa.

Career
Sportivo Carapeguá were González's first senior club. He made his professional debut with them in the Paraguayan Primera División on 1 September 2013, featuring for the full duration of a 2–2 home draw with Guaraní. He was selected in further fixtures with Cerro Porteño and Rubio Ñu during the 2013 season, which concluded with Sportivo Carapeguá suffering relegation. González was subsequently signed by top-flight General Díaz midway through the 2014 Paraguayan División Intermedia. He remained for four years, notching one hundred and nine appearances whilst scoring twice; notably his first versus Sol de América in 2017.

On 18 July 2018, González joined Defensa y Justicia of the Argentine Primera División. His first appearance arrived against Rosario Central two months later.

Career statistics
.

References

External links

1992 births
Living people
People from Carapeguá
Paraguayan footballers
Paraguayan expatriate footballers
Expatriate footballers in Argentina
Expatriate footballers in Mexico
Paraguayan expatriate sportspeople in Argentina
Paraguayan expatriate sportspeople in Mexico
Association football defenders
Paraguayan Primera División players
Argentine Primera División players
Sportivo Carapeguá footballers
General Díaz footballers
Defensa y Justicia footballers
Club Necaxa footballers